Willie Thedric Andrews (born November 2, 1983) is a former American football safety. He was drafted by the New England Patriots in the seventh round of the 2006 NFL Draft. He played college football at Baylor.

Andrews has also been a member of the Florida Tuskers and Omaha Nighthawks.

College career
Andrews was a three-year starter at Baylor and was awarded All-Big 12 honors in 2004 and 2005. Andrews ran a 4.38 40-yard dash at the 2006 NFL Combine in Indianapolis, Indiana.

Professional career

New England Patriots
After being drafted in the seventh round of the 2006 NFL Draft with the 229th overall pick by the New England Patriots, Andrews played primarily on special teams; in 2007 Andrews returned a kickoff 74 yards for a touchdown in the Patriots' Week 7 game against the Miami Dolphins.

After multiple arrests in the 2008 offseason (see "Legal troubles" below), the Patriots released Andrews.

Florida Tuskers
Andrews was signed by the Florida Tuskers of the United Football League on September 3, 2009.

Legal troubles
In July 2002, Andrews was sentenced to 30 days in jail after pleading guilty to a misdemeanor gun charge.  The gun was found in his car by Texas State Troopers during a traffic stop. At the time, Andrews was serving a two-year probation for a March 2002 conviction for misdemeanor criminal mischief.

On February 5, 2008, two days after Super Bowl XLII, Andrews was arrested in Lowell, Massachusetts and charged with possession of marijuana with intent to distribute and operating an unregistered motor vehicle. Andrews was seen driving a black Ford Crown Victoria when police received a call that there was possible drug activity in the area. Police found $6,800 in cash and a 1/2 pound of marijuana in Andrews' unregistered car.

On June 30, 2008, Andrews was arrested at his home in Mansfield, Massachusetts and charged with assault with a dangerous weapon and unlawful possession of a firearm when police responded to a call that Andrews allegedly pointed a handgun at his girlfriend's head during an argument. The handgun Andrews allegedly used was found near a dumpster at Andrews apartment complex. Andrews was released by the Patriots the next day, July 1, 2008. The charges against Andrews were dropped in March 2009 after the victim refused to testify against him in court.

In May 2011, Andrews and 12 other individuals were arrested as part of a federal investigation.

References

External links
Just Sports Stats
Baylor Bears bio 
Official New England Patriots bio 

1983 births
Living people
People from Longview, Texas
American football return specialists
American football cornerbacks
Baylor Bears football players
New England Patriots players
Florida Tuskers players
Omaha Nighthawks players
Players of American football from Texas